Somanathapura, is a village in Krishnarajapet, Mandya district in the state of Karnataka in India.

Demographics 
According to the 2011 Indian Census, the town consists of 836 people. The town has a literacy rate of 78.11 percent which is higher than Karnataka's average of 75.36 percent.

References

External links

 Somnathpur.com
 Somanathapura description
 Somnthapura

Tourism in Karnataka
Villages in Mysore district